The Gavandi surname found in the state of Maharashtra in India.

Origin

The community gets its name from the word Gaundi, which is the Marathi word for mason. They are found mainly in the district of Kolhapur, where they are said to have migrated to from Gulbarga in Karnataka. According to their traditions, they were invited by the Maratha rulers of Kolhapur to help in the building of their palaces. This people are mostly found now in areas of Marathwada and Vidarbha. Some of this clans are also related to (Sagar samaj)
Who later were said Gavandi based on their profession many of them still worship Mahadev and Raja Bhagirath as their ancestral idols.These people are Kshatriyas 
And many of them are now migrated across Maharashtra. These people use both Gavandi and Sagar as their cast.

Present circumstances

The Gavandi are still engaged in masonry, and most of the community is landless. A few are marginal farmers, and a smaller number have taken to business.

The Gavandi live in villages with other Muslim communities such as the Attar, Shilkalgar, Maner and Tamboli, as well as other Hindu castes such as the Maratha. Each of their settlement includes an informal caste council known as a biradari panchayat, that deals with issues of community welfare. They are strictly endogamous, and marry close kin. There customs are similar to other Marathi Muslim groups such as the Attar, and belong to the Sunni sect, and Hanafi sub-sect.

See also

 Silawat
 Dhawad

References

Social groups of Maharashtra
Muslim communities of India
Muslim communities of Maharashtra